Independence Plaza or variation may refer to:

 Independence Plaza, Midland, Texas, USA; an office building
 Plaza de la Independencia, Quito, Ecuador; a public square
 Plaza Independencia, Montevideo, Uruguay; a public square
 Plaza Independencia (Cebu City), Philippines

See also
 Independence Mall (disambiguation)
 Independence Square (disambiguation)
 Independence Building, several structures
 Independence (disambiguation)
 Plaza (disambiguation)